Opportunity Network is an invite-only business matchmaking platform. Members post and connect to actionable deals and investment opportunities ranging from early-stage funding to M&A, commercial partnerships, and JVs, both domestically and internationally. In 2020, the platform reached 45,000 members in 130 countries and a total transaction flow of $380BN. The company is headquartered in Barcelona and has offices in London and New York City and representatives in 40 other countries.

Opportunity Network members are vetted through partner institutions made up of banks and professionals’ associations. Today, Opportunity Network has partnerships with Credit Suisse, UBS worldwide, Citizens Bank and YPO in the  United States, London Stock Exchange Group, Intesa Sanpaolo in Italy, Vietinbank in Vietnam and ABN Amro in Netherlands, amongst others.

History

Opportunity Network was launched in 2014 in New York City by the American and Italian Brian Pallas. Pallas was attending Columbia Business School, where Boston Consulting Group had sponsored him to complete his MBA after spending two years at the firm in Milan. Pallas created a monthly newsletter where members of the business school’s Family Business Club could anonymously list the business transactions they were interested in. In 2015 the company reached a 100 million dollars valuation. In 2016 the company closed a round of funding at around 150 million dollars, which included Boston Consulting Group among the investors.

References

Matchmaking
Companies based in Barcelona
Employment social networks